Malmö West Station was a railway station in Malmö, Sweden. It was established in 1874 with the creation of the Ystad Line, from 1886 was also operated by the Continental Line. A new and larger station building was built and its use as a station ended in 1955. The station building was later used as offices for the City Tunnel project.

Buildings and structures in Malmö
Disused railway stations in Sweden
Rail transport in Malmö
Railway stations opened in 1874
Railway stations closed in 1955
1874 establishments in Sweden
1955 disestablishments in Sweden